Bobo Wule may refer to:
Bobo Wule people
Bobo Wule languages